Joseph Charlton (born April 7, 1997) is an American football punter who is a free agent. He played college football at South Carolina.

College career
Charlton was a member of the South Carolina Gamecocks for five seasons, redshirting as a true freshman. He was named South Carolina's starting punter going into his redshirt sophomore year. As a redshirt junior, Charlton set a new school record by averaging 44.8 yards per punt and was named second-team All-Southeastern Conference (SEC) by the league's coaches. He broke his own record in his senior season by averaging 47.7 yards per punt and was named second-team All-SEC and was an honorable mention All-American by Pro Football Focus. Charlton finished his collegiate career averaging 45.5 yards per punt, a school record.

Professional career

Carolina Panthers
Charlton was signed by the Carolina Panthers as an undrafted free agent on July 22, 2020. Charlton was named the Panthers punter at the end of the preseason, beating out Kaare Vedvik. Charlton made his NFL debut on September 13, 2020, in the season opener against the Las Vegas Raiders, punting twice for 120 yards (60.0 average). In Week 9, against the Kansas City Chiefs, he completed a 29-yard pass to Brandon Zylstra on a trick play. In Week 16, Charlton punted five times all inside the 20-yard-line, including a long of 67 yards in a 20–13 win over the Washington Football Team, earning NFC Special Teams Player of the Week. He was placed on injured reserve on October 14, 2021. He was released on November 16, 2021.

Kansas City Chiefs
On December 24, 2021, Charlton was signed to the Kansas City Chiefs practice squad, but was released three days later.

Jacksonville Jaguars
On December 28, 2021, Charlton was signed to the Jacksonville Jaguars practice squad.

Cleveland Browns
Charlton signed a reserve/futures contract with the Cleveland Browns on February 1, 2022. He was waived on August 22, 2022.

References

External links
South Carolina Gamecocks bio

1997 births
Living people
Players of American football from Columbia, South Carolina
A.C. Flora High School alumni
American football punters
South Carolina Gamecocks football players
Carolina Panthers players
Kansas City Chiefs players
Jacksonville Jaguars players
Cleveland Browns players